The 1974 Kuneitra Cup was an international football tournament held in Damascus, Syria, from 26 September to 9 October 1974. Morocco won the tournament, beating Syria in the final.

Format
The 11 teams were distributed in two groups: Group A was composed of Syria, Sudan, Libya, Palestine, and North Yemen; Group B of Morocco, Tunisia, Egypt B, NA Hussein Dey, Lebanon, Jordan. The top two teams of each group faced each other in the semi-finals: the winners progressed to the final, whereas the losers played the third-place match.

Group stage

Group A

Group B

Knockout stage

Bracket

Semi-finals

Third place play-off

Final

Scorers

See also
Quneitra

References

1974
Non-FIFA football competitions
Defunct international association football competitions
Defunct football competitions in Syria